This is a list of notable people from the city of Constantinople (present-day Istanbul) between the third century and 1453 CE. For a list of people born before the third century CE, see Notable people from Byzantium. For a list of people born after 1453, see List of people from Istanbul.

Saint Alexander (237/244–337)
Saint Helena (c. 250–c. 330)
Julian the Apostate (331–363), Byzantine emperor
Hecebolius (Ἑκηβόλιος), sophist and rhetor
Theodosius II (401–450) 
Proclus (412–485), Greek philosopher
Zosimus (c. 490–c. 510), Byzantine historian
Saint Arthelais (544–560)
Maximus the Confessor (c. 580–662), Christian monk, theologian, scholar and saint
Eudoxia Epiphania (b. 611), daughter of the Byzantine Emperor Heraclius
Tarasios (c. 703–806), Patriarch of Constantinople and Christian saint
Nikephoros I (c. 758–828), Patriarch of Constantinople
Saint Theophanes the Confessor (758/760–817/818)
Ignatius (c. 797–877), Patriarch of Constantinople
Kassia (805/810–c. 867), Greek poet, composer and hymnographer
Lazarus Zographos (d. 867), monk, painter and Christian saint
Photios I (c. 820–893), Patriarch of Constantinople
Nicholas Mystikos (852–925), Patriarch of Constantinople
Alexander (c. 870–913), Byzantine emperor
Constantine VII (905–959), Byzantine emperor and writer
Michael I Cerularius (c. 1000–1059), Patriarch of Constantinople
Michael Psellos (1017/1018–after 1078), Greek writer, philosopher, politician, and historian
Alexios I Komnenos (1048–1118), Byzantine emperor
Michael VII (1050–1090), Byzantine emperor
Anna Komnene (1083–1153), Greek princess and scholar
John II Komnenos (1087–1143), Byzantine emperor
Eustathius (c. 1110–1198), archbishop of Thessalonica
Isaac Komnenos (1093–1152), brother of Emperor John II Komnenos
John Tzetzes (c. 1100–1180), Byzantine poet and grammarian
Manuel I Komnenos (1118–1180), Byzantine emperor 
Isaac II Angelos (1156–1204), Byzantine emperor 
Theodore I Laskaris (1174–1221), Byzantine emperor
Alexios II Komnenos (1169–1183), Byzantine emperor
Maria Komnene (daughter of Manuel I) (1152–1182), daughter of the Emperor Manuel I Komnenos
Nicephorus Blemmydes (1197–1272), Byzantine author
Theodore Metochites (1207–1332), Greek statesman, author, gentleman philosopher, and patron of the arts
George Acropolites (1217–1282), Greek historian and statesman
Michael VIII Palaiologos (1223–1282), Byzantine emperor
Andronikos II Palaiologos (1259–1332), Byzantine emperor
John VI Kantakouzenos (c. 1292–1383), Byzantine emperor
Gregory Palamas (1296–1359), Archbishop of Thessalonica
Andronikos III Palaiologos (1297–1341), Byzantine emperor
Manuel Chrysoloras (1355–1415), Greek scholar and grammarian
Gennadius II Scholarius (c. 1400–1473), philosopher, Patriarch of Constantinople
Saint Laura of Constantinople (c. 1400–1453), nun, abbess, saint
Constantine XI (1405–1453), Byzantine emperor and saint
John Argyropoulos (1415–1487), Greek lecturer, philosopher and humanist
Constantine Lascaris (1434–1501), Greek scholar and grammarian

See also 
 Constantinople
 Istanbul
 Byzantium

References

Constantinople
Constatinople